Indirect parliamentary elections were held in Burundi in 1954.

Background
The Decree of 14 July 1952 by the Belgian authorities had introduced an element of democracy to the Burundian political system. A complicated electoral system was created, which involved seven stages of elections to eventually elect the National Superior Council.

The elections began in the sub-chiefdoms, then were held in the chiefdoms, then the territories, and finally at the national level.

Results
The elections in the sub-chiefdoms and chiefdoms were held in 1953, with the elections to the Territorial Councils and the Superior Council following in 1954.

References

1954 elections in Africa
1954 in Burundi
1954